Cunhai may refer to:

 Amphisbaena cunhai, Hoogmoed & Ávila-Pires, 1991, a worm lizard species in the genus Amphisbaena

 Typhlonectes cunhai, a species of amphibian endemic to Brazil